Barton Stadium may refer to:

 Barton Stadium (Winsford), a stadium used by Winsford United F.C. and 1874 Northwich F.C.
 City of Salford Stadium, a proposed rugby league stadium for Salford City Reds
 Peter Barton Lacrosse Stadium, the home of Denver Pioneers men's lacrosse